Puss in Boots (Кот в сапогах in Cyrillic; Kot v sapogakh in transliteration) is a short opera-fairytale for children in three acts, four tableaux, composed by César Cui in 1913.  The libretto was written by Marina Stanislavovna Pol'. It was premiered in Rome in 1915 under the title Il gatto con gli stivali.  A Soviet edition of the opera, with a revised libretto, was published in 1961.  By the 1970s this opera seems to have become popular in what was then East Germany as Der gestiefelte Kater.  Under that title it was recorded later on CD by the Staatsoper Stuttgart in 1999 in a version designed for radio.

Characters
The Cat
Jean, youngest son of the miller; he is the Marquis de Carabas:
Middle Son of the miller
Oldest Son of the miller
King
Princess, daughter of the King
The Ogre
The Princess' girlfriends, courtiers, reapers, hay-makers, ogre's servants (chorus)

Plot
The plot follows very closely the fairytale by Perrault, with an instrumental introduction and inserted dances.

Bibliography
Boas, Robert.  "Nuremberg." Opera [London], v. 32 (1981), pp. 288–289.
Cui, César.  Кот в сапогах:  опера-сказка трех действиях.  [Puss-in-Boots:  opera in three acts.]  Светлячок, 1913.
Soviet (revised) edition:  Кот в сапогах:  опера-сказка для детей в двух действиях, четырех картинах.  Либретто М. Львовского. [Puss-in-Boots: opera-fairytale for children in two acts, four tableaux.  Libretto by M. Lvovsky.]  Москва: Гос. муз. изд-во, 1961.
Nazarov, A.F. Цезарь Антонович Кюи. [Tsezar Antonovich Cui.] (Moskva: Muzyka, 1989).
Papp, G.  "Der Gestiefelte Kater und 'Kling-Klang, Rockmuzik zum Antassen'," Musik und Gesellschaft, v. 32 (1982), p. 472.

Discography

Puss in Boots: Opera Fairy-tale by César Cui in a performance from the All-Union Radio in 1948 - Puss: Pavel Pontryagin (singing)/Nikolai Litvinov (spoken), Jean: Georgy Vinogradov, The middle son of the miller: Alexei Usmanov, The eldest son of the miller: Daniil Demyanov, The King: Georgy Abramov, The Princess: Zoya Muratova, The Cannibal: Konstantin Polyaev, Conducted by Leonid Pyatigorsky / Published by Aquarius Classic 2018

Der gestiefelte Kater: Märchenoper von César Cui in der Hörspielfassung von Linde von Keyserlingk.  Fassung für Kammerorchester: Andreas Breitscheid.  Koproduction:  Junge Oper der Staatsoper Stuttgart / Südwestrundfunk / Patmos Verlag GmbH & Co. KG, Düsseldorf, 1999.  Patmos CD, 3-491-88764-X.

Operas by César Cui
Russian-language operas
Children's operas
1915 operas
Operas
Works based on Puss in Boots
Operas based on works by Charles Perrault
Operas based on fairy tales